Arctowski Nunatak is a nunatak  northwest of Hertha Nunatak in the Seal Nunataks group, off the east coast of the Antarctic Peninsula. It was charted by the Swedish Antarctic Expedition under Otto Nordenskiöld during a sledge journey in 1902, and named by him for Henryk Arctowski, Polish geologist, oceanographer, and meteorologist of the Belgian Antarctic Expedition, 1897–99.

References
 

Nunataks of Graham Land
Oscar II Coast
Poland and the Antarctic